Pickering, Darby and Allday Ltd, PDA, was a British automobile manufacturer from 1912 to 1913. They built the PDA Cyclecar at their works in Birmingham, equipped with V2-engines from various manufacturers. Approximately 15 units were built.

See also
 List of car manufacturers of the United Kingdom

References

Sources 
 Harald Linz und Halwart Schrader: Die Internationale Automobil-Enzyklopädie. United Soft Media Verlag GmbH, München 2008, 
 Nick Georgano: The Beaulieu Encyclopedia of the Automobile, Volume 3 P–Z. Fitzroy Dearborn Publishers, Chicago 2001,  (englisch)
 David Culshaw & Peter Horrobin: The Complete Catalogue of British Cars 1895-1975. Veloce Publishing plc. Dorchester (1997). 

Defunct motor vehicle manufacturers of England
Defunct companies based in Birmingham, West Midlands
Manufacturing companies based in Birmingham, West Midlands